André Bernard may refer to:

 André Bernard (cyclist) (1930–2015), French cyclist
 André Bernard (pentathlete) (born 1935), French Olympic modern pentathlete
 André Antoine Bernard (1751–1818), French lawyer and revolutionary
 Andrée Bernard (born 1966), English actress